In fluid mechanics, pipe flow is a type of liquid flow within a closed conduit, such as a pipe or tube. The other type of flow within a conduit is open channel flow. 
These two types of flow are similar in many ways, but differ in one important aspect. Pipe flow does not have a free surface which is found in open-channel flow. Pipe flow, being confined within closed conduit, does not exert direct atmospheric pressure, but does exert hydraulic pressure on the conduit.

Not all flow within a closed conduit is considered pipe flow. Storm sewers are closed conduits but usually maintain a free surface and therefore are considered open-channel flow. The exception to this is when a storm sewer operates at full capacity, and then can become pipe flow.

Energy in pipe flow is expressed as head and is defined by the Bernoulli equation. In order to conceptualize head along the course of flow within a pipe, diagrams often contain a hydraulic grade line (HGL). Pipe flow is subject to frictional losses as defined by the Darcy-Weisbach formula.

Laminar-turbulence transition
The behaviour of pipe flow is governed mainly by the effects of viscosity and gravity relative to the inertial forces of the flow. Depending on the effect of viscosity relative to inertia, as represented by the Reynolds number, the flow can be either laminar or turbulent. For circular pipes of different surface roughness, at a Reynolds number below the critical value of approximately 2000 pipe flow will ultimately be laminar, whereas above the critical value turbulent flow can persist, as shown in Moody chart. For non-circular pipes, such as rectangular ducts, the critical Reynolds number is shifted, but still   depending on the aspect ratio. Earlier transition to turbulence, happening at Reynolds number one order of magnitude smaller, i.e. , can happen in channels with special geometrical shapes, such as the Tesla valve. 

Flow through pipes can roughly be divided into two:
Laminar flow - see Hagen-Poiseuille flow
Turbulent flow - see Moody diagram

See also

 Mathematical equations and concepts
 Bernoulli equation
 Darcy–Weisbach equation
 Torricelli's law
 Fields of study
 Hydraulics
 Fluid Mechanics
 Types of fluid flow
 Open channel flow
 Plug flow
 Fluid properties
 Viscosity
 Fluid phenomena
 Head

References

Further reading
Chow, V. T. (1959/2008). Open-Channel Hydraulics. Caldwell, New Jersey: Blackburn Press. .

Fluid dynamics
Fluid mechanics
Piping